Eulises Pavón (born 6 January 1993) is a Nicaraguan footballer who plays for Estudiantes de Caracas in Venezuela.

References

External links
 Eulises Pavón at playmakerstats.com (English version of ceroacero.es)

1993 births
Living people
Nicaraguan men's footballers
People from Carazo Department
Nicaragua international footballers
Nicaraguan expatriate footballers
Expatriate footballers in Guatemala
Diriangén FC players
C.D. Walter Ferretti players
C.D. Suchitepéquez players
Association football forwards
2017 Copa Centroamericana players
2017 CONCACAF Gold Cup players
Nicaragua under-20 international footballers
Nicaragua youth international footballers